First Edition is a 1977 American short documentary film about the Baltimore Sun directed by Helen Whitney. It was nominated for an Academy Award for Best Documentary Short.

References

External links
, posted by the Baltimore Sun

1977 films
1977 documentary films
1977 short films
American short documentary films
1970s short documentary films
1970s English-language films
1970s American films